Lucero Ximena Cuevas Flores (born 22 January 1996) is a Mexican footballer who plays as a striker for Club León.

Club career
Prior to turning professional, Cuevas played in the amateur Liga Mexicana de Fútbol Femenil with Ballenas Galeana and Leonas Morelos.

América
On 29 July 2017, Cuevas made her debut for Club América against Club Tijuana, scoring the winning goal in the 19th minute. On 4 August, Cuevas scored the first hat-trick in Liga MX Femenil history in a 5–0 win over Cruz Azul. She ended the 2017 Apertura as top goalscorer, netting 15 times in 14 games. She repeated the feat in the 2018 Clausura, again scoring 15 goals.

Tijuana
In December 2019, Cuevas and her América teammate Esmeralda Verdugo were the victims of an express kidnapping. The following month, she joined Club Tijuana on loan.

León
In August 2020, Cuevas joined Club León ahead of the 2020–21 season. She departed León at the end of that season.

Pachuca
In June 2021, Cuevas signed with C.F. Pachuca.

International career
On 15 November 2017 Cuevas received her first call-up with the Mexico national team, On November 27 she made her debut with the national team coming in as a substitute for Charlyn Corral at minute 79' in a game that ended with a favorable score of 0–2 against Costa Rica in a match held in the Alejandro Morera Soto Stadium.

Career statistics

Club

Honours and achievements

Individual
 Liga MX Femenil top scorer: Apertura 2017
 Liga MX Femenil Team of The Season: Apertura 2017
 Liga MX Femenil top scorer: Clausura 2018
 Liga MX Femenil Team of The Season: Clausura 2018

See also
List of people from Morelos, Mexico

References

External links
 

1996 births
Living people
People from Cuernavaca
Mexican women's footballers
Footballers from Morelos
Women's association football forwards
Liga MX Femenil players
Club Tijuana (women) footballers
Club América (women) footballers
Club León (women) footballers
Mexico women's international footballers
Mexican footballers